Pedro "Teno" Pangelinan Tenorio (April 18, 1934 – May 21, 2018) was a Northern Mariana Islander politician who served as the second and fifth governor of the Northern Mariana Islands from January 11, 1982 to January 8, 1990 and then from January 12, 1998 to January 14, 2002.

With 12 years in office, Tenorio was the longest-serving governor in CNMI history.

Biography
Tenorio was born on Saipan. He graduated from George Washington High School in Guam and attended the University of Guam. He worked as a schoolteacher, a shipping executive, and a supervisor for a Naval technical and training unit. He first served in the House of Representatives of the Congress of Micronesia and subsequently became a member of the Marianas District Legislature.

In 1978, when the Northern Mariana Islands became a U.S. commonwealth (CNMI), he was elected vice president of the Northern Mariana Islands Senate in the first commonwealth legislature and chairman of the Programs Committee. He was elected president of the senate in 1980. Sworn in as governor in 1982, he was reelected for a second term in 1985. He was elected Governor again in November 1997 and was inaugurated on January 12, 1998.

Tenorio was married to Sophia “Sophie” Pangelinan Tenorio and had nine children, Peter Michael, Ruth Christine, Patrick James, Paul Gilbert, Perry John, Reina Sophia, Roslyn Carlyn, Rebecca Dena, Peter Patrick, and reared son Francisco.  He died on May 21, 2018 at the Commonwealth Health Center, Garapan, Saipan, and was buried at Mount Carmel Cemetery in Chalan Kanoa, Saipan.

References

|-

|-

|-

1934 births
2018 deaths
Burials in the Northern Mariana Islands
Governors of the Northern Mariana Islands
People from Saipan
Republican Party (Northern Mariana Islands) politicians
Republican Party governors of the Northern Mariana Islands
University of Guam alumni
Presidents of the Northern Mariana Islands Senate